Achlaena is a genus of mantises belonging to the family Chroicopteridae, containing the single species Achlaena grandis from Central Africa.

References

Mantodea